The Sheikh al-Karama Forces is an armed group based in the As-Suwayda Governorate in southern eastern Syria, composed of Druze locals, the group is led by two brothers who are the sons of the founder of another Druze militia group called the Men of Dignity in 2012 and led his group until his death in 2015. The group has clashed with Syrian government forces and Hezbollah on numerous occasions, though the group has fought with Syrian government forces and allied paramilitaries it is not part of the nationwide Free Syrian Army or general Syrian Opposition. Members of the Druze community and the group have been targeted by the Syrian government, the group claims that several members of the Druze community in the Suwayda governorate have been arrested and tortured under terrorism charges.

Background
The al-Karama Forces' are led by brothers, named Layth and Fahd al-Balaous who are the sons of a prominent local named Wahid al-Balaous who established a militia in 2012 called the "Men of Dignity" in Suwayda. There was also an internal conflict in the group between the group's leadership and a commander who was later killed in May 2019.

Men of Dignity
The Men of Dignity emerged in 2014 with supporters of Wahid al-Balaous who was a dissident of the government in the Druze community and initially called for the removal of the Syrian government. However, he and his movement were noted as neither being supportive of the Syrian government nor necessarily opposed to it, but rather wanted reform and steps to be taken to reduce corruption within the Syrian government. There was also speculation as to whether he wanted to establish his own separatist Druze state or make a deal with the FSA for autonomy. Despite this, however, his supporters were known to use the flag of Syria and refer to the Syrian army respectably as the Syrian Arab Army. The group also stressed strict self-defense, and claimed to have support from the Druze community in Israel which it called Palestine instead, and does reject Druze cooperation with the Israeli government. The Men of Dignity also did not oppose the Syrian military. However, they did oppose the government's conscription program and instead wanted to focus on local defense.

Wahid al-Balaous was killed by a car bomb in 2015. After his death, many false reports emerged that Druze militants were joining the Free Syrian Army, and that a new Druze FSA group had been established in Suwayda, as part of the greater Syrian Civil War that has left Suwayda largely unaffected. After the assassination, the group released a statement blaming the government. However, they expressed they would continue to work within a framework supported by the government. A new leader also took over the group named Yahya al-Hajjar. However, due to disagreements with al-Hajjar's leadership, the Balaous brothers split from the Men of Dignity and formed the Sheikh al-Karama Forces.  However, they do not hold tensions with the Men of Dignity.

History
In 2015, the group was established after splitting from the Men of Dignity Druze militia.

On 21 February 2019, the Sheikh al-Karama Forces attacked the Syrian government's military intelligence paramilitary forces in Suwayda, over the government's seizure of a house in the city years prior, that belonged to a member of the Syrian opposition, after the member's family asked the group to help them retake the house from the government.

On 3 May 2019, one of the group's commanders named Wissam Eid was killed by unidentified gunmen south of Suwayda. He survived the assassination. However, he later died at a hospital due to injuries from the attack. Later on the same day, a Syrian government military intelligence position was attacked by gunmen. However, the Sheikh al-Karama Forces denied it was behind the attack on the military intelligence outpost. Wissam reportedly led his own faction in the group that held tensions with the main leadership and was previously the target of an assassination attempt in April 2019, and both Wissam's faction and the main leadership have accused each other of committing crimes including kidnappings and murder.

On 4 December 2019, the group released a statement that called on natives of the Suwayda governorate abroad to send financial aid due to a reported increase in poverty in the area; the group also denounced aid programs from the Syrian government and Russia. The group also claims that the government intentionally neglects the governorate, and called Russian forces in Syria occupation forces, and also claimed that they were stealing from Syria.

On 26 March 2020, the group clashed with the Syrian military in the southern part of the Suywada governorate. During the clashes, 4 fighters belonging to the Sheikh al-Karama Forces were killed and 1 pro-government fighter was killed. After the clashes, the al-Karama Forces announced they were increasing their level of preparedness for future confrontations with the government, and days prior to the clashes the group swapped prisoners with the government.

See also
Jaysh al-Muwahhideen
Sultan Pasha al-Atrash Battalion
Golan Regiment
Al-Sanadid Forces
Syrian National Resistance

References

Military units and factions of the Syrian civil war
Rebel groups in Syria
Druze in Syria
2014 establishments in Syria
Druze militant groups